Porta Cordillera is a land-locked tourism region in the central mountainous region of Puerto Rico.  It consists of 16 municipalities in the south central zone: Aguas Buenas, Cidra, Cayey, Comerío, Aibonito, Naranjito, Barranquitas, Corozal, Orocovis, Morovis, Ciales, Jayuya, Florida, Utuado, Adjuntas and  Lares.

The zone is known for its stunning nature reserves, forests, coffee plantations, lakes, rivers, and caves as well as its protected karst area.  Puerto Rico's Ruta Panorámica notably cuts through the heart of this region.

Porta Cordillera was established in July 2012 by the Puerto Rico Tourism Company. The name translates to "Doorway to the Cordillera", where "cordillera" refers to Puerto Rico's Cordillera Central - the central mountain range of the island. Utuado and Aguas Buenas are not part of the Cordillera Central, but they are part of the tourism zone nevertheless. Adjuntas and Jayuya were part of the Porta Caribe region since the creation of that zone, but was moved to the Porta Cordillera region.

History
The creation of the tourist region was the result of Puerto Rico Law 54 of 4 August 2009. Representative for District 28 - which comprises 4 of the 16 towns in the zone (Barranquitas, Corozal, Naranjito and Comerío) - Rafael ‘June’ Rivera authored the bill that became Law 54.

Inventory
When the ragion was created in July 2012, the Puerto Rico Tourism Company already endorsed 136 rooms in lodgings located in Adjuntas, Cidra, Jayuya and Utuado.

Attractions
On the western end of Porta Cordillera is the historical town of Lares, known for sparking the famous rebellion against colonial Spanish rule.

Porta Cordillera's attractions also include the Caguana Indian Ceremonial Center in Utuado. Nearby is also Lago Dos Bocas,  where complimentary boats ferry visitors to lakeside creole restaurants, as well as Río Abajo State Forest and Cueva Ventana.

The Toro Negro State Forest which is extends over five municipalities also spans into the Porta Cordillera towns of Jayuya, Orocovis and Ciales, and has extensive views from the highest elevation in Puerto Rico, including Monte Jayuya.

Aibonito has Mirador Piedra Degetau (Piedra Degetau Rock Lookout) from which there are views, as well as an annual flower festival held every year at the end of June.

Carite National Forest has many natural wonders as well as restaurants located along the mountain slopes. The region also includes Ruta del Lechón (Pork Route) in Guavate State Forest. The "lechón asado" is a spit-roasted pig meal with all the local fixings.

Porta Cordillera is home to the time-honored Puerto Rican jibarito and the region brushes into the Monumento al Jíbaro Puertorriqueño, officially located in the Porta Caribe municipality of Salinas but long-claimed by Porta Cordillera's town of Cayey.

Other attractions
Adjuntas 
Casa Pueblo
Inabón waterfall
Aibonito 
Casa Manresa
La Trinchera de Asomante
Jayuya
Hacienda Gripiñas
Toro Negro State Forest
Cemi Museum and Written Stone

See also

Porta Caribe
Porta del Sol

References

External links

Tourism in Puerto Rico
Tourism regions